Taphronota ferruginea is a species from the genus Taphronota. The species was first described in 1781.

References

Pyrgomorphidae

Insects described in 1781